Adesegun Adeosun Jnr, popularly known as Smade, is a Nigerian-born British event promoter, creative industry expert and entrepreneur.He is co-founder and CEO of Afro Nation, an annual music festival established to bring together the best African artists in Afrobeats, Hip hop, RnB, Dancehall, Amapiano, Afro House and more. He is also the founder of Smade Entertainment, a UK-based entertainment company.

Early life and education 
Born in Lagos State, Nigeria and raised by both parents, Smade had his primary education at Ronik International School, Lagos and secondary education at Lagos State Model College. He moved to London after gaining admission to study advertising and marketing at University of the Arts London. He then went on to acquire a Masters of Business Administration (MBA) in Marketing Pathway-Pass at GSM London between 2011,  a Masters of Business Administration (MBA) from the University of Wales in 2012.

Career

Afro Nation
In 2013, Smade alongside his business partner Obi Asika, who is also serve as co- founder decided to form an event or Afro-like festival or carnaval to promote African acts globally, of which they formed Afro Nation. The maiden African edition was held in October 2019 at Accra, Ghana.Since the formation of Afro Nation, Smade have worked with several prominent artists including  Wizkid, Davido, Burna Boy, Kizz Daniel, Tiwa Savage, Yemi Alade, Black Sherif, Naira Marley, Patoranking, Adekunle Gold, CKay, Stonebwoy and others.    

In 2007, he established his entertainment management company, Smade Entertainment, an entertainment firm that was approved as co-partner in 2019 to co-organize Afro Nation annually.

Awards and recognition 
Smade received several awards and recognitions for his work, some of which are:
  2019  Best of Africa Awards –  Outstanding Achievements for Event Promotion Winner
  2019 African Diaspora Awards –   Special Recognition Award, Promotion of music and culture Winner
 2019 Afrobeats Live and Awards Power Players– Winner
 2019 The Nelas Academy Awards- Entertainment Promoter of the year Winner
 2022 Global African Awards –  Outstanding contribution to Showbiz and Entertainment Winner

Personal life 
He married his Zimbabwean girlfriend, Sianne McKop, on 20 October 2015, at the City Pavilion in London.

References 

1984 births
Nigerian music industry executives
Living people
Nigerian people of British descent
Nigerian entertainment industry businesspeople
Yoruba businesspeople
21st-century Nigerian businesspeople